Thenral Nagar is a township in Tiruvannamalai Taluk in Tiruvannamalai District in Tamil Nadu State. Melathikkan is 2.6 km far from its Taluk Main Town Tiruvannamalai . It is located 2.9 km distance from its District Main City Tiruvannamalai . It is located 158 km distance from its State Main City Chennai .

Near-by towns & panchayats with distance are Tiruvannamalai (2.9 km), Thenmathur (3.3 km), So.Kilnachipattu (3.4 km), Chinnakangiyanur (3.8 km), Nallavanpalayam (4.3 km), . Towns Near By Tiruvannamalai (2.6 km), Thandrampet (15.3 km), Thurinjapuram (19.9 km), Keelpennathur (21.8 km) .

Demographics
Thenral nagar having population of over 29000 providing sub urban to Tiruvannamalai urbanity. it comes under Tiruvannamalai urban agglomerations on Polur road (chitoor- Cudllore road) NH 234A. there is one railway station for Thenral nagar
as "Vengikkal-Thenral nagar" at katpadi railway route.

References

External links

Cities and towns in Tiruvannamalai district